Alain Berger (born December 27, 1990) is a Swiss former professional ice hockey forward who most notably played for SC Bern of the National League (NL).

Playing career
Originally developing with SC Bern in Switzerland, Berger played two seasons of major junior hockey in the Ontario Hockey League with the Oshawa Generals, but was not drafted by a National Hockey League club. On April 8, 2011, the Montreal Canadiens signed Berger as a free agent to three-year entry-level contract.

Berger returned to play for SC Bern on December 11, 2012, after he was granted a release in the midst of his contract with the Canadiens.

On January 20, 2017, Berger was suspended for two games and fined CHF 2,420 for a hit to the head of EHC Kloten's Lukas Stoop.

On December 18, 2019, Berger agreed to an early two-year contract extension with SC Bern through the 2021–22 season.

Personal
Alain is married to famous Canadian social media personality Zar Ann

Career statistics

Regular season and playoffs

International

Awards and honours

References

External links

1990 births
Living people
Hamilton Bulldogs (AHL) players
Oshawa Generals players
SC Bern players
Swiss ice hockey right wingers
People from Burgdorf, Switzerland
Sportspeople from the canton of Bern